Kaogu is a peer-reviewed monthly academic journal of Chinese archaeology, published by the Institute of Archaeology of the Chinese Academy of Social Sciences.

History
The predecessor to what would become Kaogu was published from 1934 to 1937, with each issue containing only a couple of articles. The earliest version of the journal was published in 1955, however it appeared irregularly until 1959. Regular publication was temporarily suspended between 1966 and 1971, during the Cultural Revolution.

Content
The journal publishes summarized descriptions of excavations across China, but more recently research articles have also been included. Following cultural heritage laws, the work of foreigners on China must first be published in Chinese, and so Kaogu is also the main repository of data on international joint research between Chinese and non-Chinese that intensified in the 1990s. Most articles contain short English summaries.

References

 Barnes, Gina L. China, Korea, and Japan: The Rise of Civilization in East Asia. Thames and Hudson, London, 1993.

External links
 

Archaeology journals
Archaeology of China
Chinese-language journals
Publications established in 1955
Monthly journals
Chinese Academy of Social Sciences
1955 establishments in China